Rhythm & Blues is an American sitcom television series created by Jordan Moffet, that aired on NBC for five weeks from September 24 to October 22, 1992, with an additional left over episode airing on February 12, 1993. The show stars Roger Kabler, Anna Maria Horsford, Ron Glass, Troy Curvey Jr., Vanessa Bell Calloway, Miguel A. Nunez, Jr., and Christopher Babers.

Premise
Rhythm & Blues stars Kabler as Bobby Soul, a white man who gets hired on a black radio station after being initially mistaken as a black man.

Cast
Roger Kabler as Bobby Soul
Anna Maria Horsford as Veronica Washington
Vanessa Bell Calloway as Colette Hawkins
Ron Glass as Don Phillips
Miguel A. Núñez Jr. as Jammin
Christopher Babers  as Earl "Ziggy" Washington
Troy Curvey Jr. as The Love Man

Episodes

Reception
Despite being listed among NBC's Must See TV Thursday night lineup after A Different World at 8:00 and before Cheers at 9:00, the show was cancelled after only five weeks due to low ratings. The show was heavily criticized for relying on traditional black stereotypes for its humor.  TV Guide said that: "What makes a show built on white jokes any better than a show built on black jokes?"

References

External links

1990s American black sitcoms
1990s American sitcoms
1992 American television series debuts
1992 American television series endings
English-language television shows
NBC original programming
Television series by 20th Century Fox Television
Television shows set in Detroit